
Rahama is a small town in the highlands of Kaduna State central Nigeria.

Transport 

It was served for a time by the extra narrow gauge Bauchi Light Railway which connected Zaria in the north to Jos in the south.

In later times, this route was replaced by a better graded normal gauge railway on a different alignment.

See also 

 Railway stations in Nigeria

References 

Populated places in Kaduna State